This is a survey of the postage stamps and postal history of Tolima.

Tolima Department is one of the 32 departments of Colombia, located in the Andean region, in the center-west of the country. The department of Tolima was created in 1861 from a part of what had been Cundinamarca.

First stamps
The first postage stamps of Tolima were issued in 1870.

See also
Postage stamps and postal history of Colombia

References

Further reading
Anyon, Alan D. Handbook of Colombian Revenue Stamps. Bogota, Colombia: COLOMPHIL, Colombian Philatelic Research Society, 2009.

External links
Colombia-Panama Philatelic Study Group

Tolima Department
Philately of Colombia
1861 establishments in the Granadine Confederation